Șimian is a commune in Bihor County, Crișana, Romania with a population of 3,876 people. It is composed of three villages: Șilindru (Érselénd), Șimian and Voivozi (Érkenéz).

Natives
 Ferenc Kazinczy (1759 – 1831), Hungarian author, poet, neologist

References

Communes in Bihor County
Localities in Crișana